The Green Lift or Going Up by the Green Lift (Swedish: Oppåt med gröna hissen) is a 1952 Swedish comedy film directed by Börje Larsson and starring Stig Järrel, Annalisa Ericson and Gunnar Björnstrand. It was shot at the Stocksund Studios in Stockholm and on location around the city. The film's sets were designed by the art director Bibi Lindström. It is based on the Broadway play Fair and Warmer by Avery Hopwood, which had previously been adapted into a 1944 Swedish film The Green Lift also directed by Larsson.

Cast
 Stig Järrel as William 'Billy' Forsberg
 Annalisa Ericson as 	Blanche Lövman
 Gunnar Björnstrand as 	Malte Lövman
 Inger Juel as 	Marianne Forsberg
 Georg Rydeberg as Philip Lange
 Tollie Zellman as 	Millie
 Lillebil Kjellén as 	Elsie
 Gus Dahlström as 	Gus 
 Holger Höglund as 	Holger 
 Georg Adelly as 	Oscar 
 John Botvid as 	Johansson 
 Erna Groth as 	Majsan 
 Axel Högel as 	Guard 
 Gösta Krantz as 	Guard 
 Carl-Gustaf Lindstedt as 	Guard 
 Hanny Schedin as 	Woman

References

Bibliography 
 Qvist, Per Olov & von Bagh, Peter. Guide to the Cinema of Sweden and Finland. Greenwood Publishing Group, 2000.

External links 
 

1952 films
Swedish comedy films
1952 comedy films
1950s Swedish-language films
Films directed by Börje Larsson
Swedish films based on plays
Remakes of Swedish films
1950s Swedish films